Gustur Cahyo Putro (born 11 January 1997) is an Indonesian professional footballer who plays as a winger for Liga 2 club Bekasi City.

Club career

PPSM Magelang
Gustur started his football career with PPSM Magelang.

PS TNI
He made his professionally debut in the Liga 1 on April 17, 2017 who he scored one goal against Borneo FC.

Bekasi City
On 7 June 2022, it was announced that Gustur would be joining Bekasi City for the 2022-23 Liga 2 campaign.

Career statistics

Club

Honours

Club
PS TNI U-21
 Indonesia Soccer Championship U-21: 2016

References

External links
 
 Gustur Cahyo at Liga Indonesia

1997 births
Indonesian footballers
Living people
Association football wingers
PS TIRA players
PPSM Magelang players
PSIS Semarang players
PSCS Cilacap players
People from Magelang
Sportspeople from Central Java